Selected Letters II, 1925-1929 is a collection of letters by H. P. Lovecraft. It was released in 1968 by Arkham House in an edition of 2,482 copies.  It is the second of a five volume series of collections of Lovecraft's letters and includes a preface by August Derleth and Donald Wandrei.

Contents

Selected Letters II, 1925-1929 includes letters to:

 Lillian D. Clark
 Frank Belknap Long
 August Derleth
 Donald Wandrei
 Clark Ashton Smith
 Zealia Bishop
 Woodburn Harris

Reprints

2nd printing of 3,041 copies, 1975.

References

1968 non-fiction books
Arkham House books
Books published posthumously
Collections of letters
Non-fiction books by H. P. Lovecraft